Rimon may refer to:

People with the name 
Rimon Hossain, Bangladeshi footballer
Rahman Rimon, Bangladeshi politician
Yosef Zvi Rimon, Israeli rabbi and author

Other uses 
Rimon-et-Savel, a commune in France
Rimon (magazine), a Hebrew magazine
Café Rimon,  an Israeli restaurant chain
Rimon Winery, an Israeli winery
Rimon School of Jazz and Contemporary Music, a music school in Ramat Hasharon, Israel
Beit Rimon, а populated place in Israel
Gat Rimon, an agricultural community in Israel
Operation Rimon 20, an Israeli military operation

See also 
 Rimmon